Dipriocampe is a genus of insects belonging to the family Tetracampidae.

The species of this genus are found in Europe.

Species:
 Dipriocampe bouceki Gumovsky & Perkovsky, 2005 
 Dipriocampe diprioni (Ferriere, 1935) 
 Dipriocampe elongata (Erdös, 1951)

References

Tetracampidae
Hymenoptera genera